The Battle of the Vale of Siddim, also often called the War of Nine Kings or the Slaughter of Chedorlaomer, is an event in the Hebrew Bible book of  that occurs in the days of Abram and Lot. The Vale of Siddim was the battleground for the cities of the Jordan River plain revolting against Mesopotamian rule.

Whether this event occurred in history has been disputed by scholars. According to Ronald Hendel, "The current consensus is that there is little or no historical memory of pre-Israelite events in Genesis."

Background
The Book of Genesis explains that during the days of Lot, the vale of Siddim was a river valley where the Battle of Siddim occurred between four Mesopotamian armies and five cities of the Jordan plain. According to the biblical account, before the destruction of Sodom and Gomorrah, the Elamite King Chedorlaomer had subdued the tribes and cities surrounding the Jordan River plain. After 13 years, four kings of the cities of the Jordan plain revolted against Chedorlaomer's rule. In response, Chedorlaomer and three other kings started a campaign against King Bera of Sodom and four other allied kings.

Location

Siddim is thought to be located on the southern end of the Dead Sea. It has been suggested by theologians that the destruction of the cities of the Jordan Plain by divine fire and brimstone may have caused Siddim to become a salt sea, what is now the Dead Sea.

Aftermath

The Northern forces overwhelmed the Southern kings of the Jordan plain, driving some of them into the asphalt or tar pits that littered the valley. Those who escaped fled to the mountains, including the kings of Sodom and Gomorrah. These two cities were then spoiled of their goods and provisions and some of their citizens were captured. Among the captives was Abram's nephew, Lot.

When word reached Abram while he was staying in Elonei Mamre with Aner and Eshcol, he immediately mounted a rescue operation, arming 318 of his trained servants, who went in pursuit of the enemy armies that were returning to their homelands. They caught up with them in the city of Dan, flanking the enemy on multiple sides during a night raid. The attack ran its course as far as Hobah, north of Damascus, where he defeated Chedorlaomer and his forces. Abram recovered all the goods and the captives (including Lot).

After the battle, Melchizedek, king of Salem, brought out bread and wine and blessed Abram, who gave him a tenth of the plunder as tithes. Then Bera, king of Sodom, came to Abram and thanked him, requesting that he keep the plunder but return his people. Abram declined, saying, "I swore I would never take anything from you, so you can never say 'I have made Abram rich.'" What Abram accepted from Bera instead was food for his 318 men and his Amorite neighbours.

Scholarly analysis

Identifying the kings
Amraphel has been thought by some scholars such as the writers of the Catholic Encyclopedia (1907) and The Jewish Encyclopedia (1906) to be an alternate name of the famed Hammurabi. The name is also associated with Ibal-pi-el II of Esnunna. However, this view has been largely abandoned in recent years as there were other kings named Hammurabi in Yamhad and Ugarit.Other scholars have identified Amraphel with Aralius, one of the names on the later Babylonian king-lists, attributed first to Ctesias. Recently, David Rohl argued for an identification with Amar-Sin, the third ruler of the Ur III dynasty.John Van Seters, in Abraham in History and Tradition, rejected the historical existence of Amraphel.

Arioch has been thought to have been a king of Larsa (Ellasar being an alternate version of this). It has also been suggested that it is URU KI, meaning "this place here". Others identify Ellasar with Ilan-Sura which is a city known from second millennium BC Mari archives in the vicinity of north of Mari, and Arioch with Arriwuk who appears in Mari archives as a subordinate of Zimri-Lim.

Following the discovery of documents written in the Elamite language and Babylonian language, it was thought that Chedorlaomer is a transliteration of the Elamite compound Kudur-Lagamar, meaning servant of Lagamaru – a reference to Lagamaru, an Elamite deity whose existence was mentioned by Ashurbanipal. However, no mention of an individual named Kudur Lagamar has yet been found; inscriptions that were thought to contain this name are now known to have different names (the confusion arose due to similar lettering).

Tidal has been considered to be a transliteration of Tudhaliya – either referring to the first king of the Hittite New Kingdom (Tudhaliya I) or the proto-Hittite king named Tudhaliya. With the former, the title king of Nations would refer to the allies of the Hittite kingdom such as the Ammurru and Mittani; with the latter the term "goyiim" has the sense of "them, those people". al ("their power") gives the sense of a people or tribe rather than a kingdom. Hence td goyim ("those people have created a state and stretched their power"). Others identify Goyim with Gutium, which appears in both Sumerian and Akkadian texts from 3rd millennium BC.

Geopolitical context

Alliances
It was common practice for vassals/allies to accompany a powerful king during their conquests. For example, in a letter from about 1770 BCE reporting a speech aimed at persuading the nomadic tribes to acknowledge the authority of Zimri-Lim of Mari: There is no king who can be mighty alone. Ten or fifteen kings follow Hammurabi the man of Babylon; as many follow Rim-Sin the man of Larsa, Ibal-pi-El the man of Eshnunna, and Amut-pi-El the man of Qatna and twenty kings follow Yarim-Lim the man of Yamhad.

The alliance of four states would have ruled over cities/countries that were spread over a wide area: from Elam at the extreme eastern end of the Fertile Crescent to Anatolia at the western edge of this region. Because of this, there is a limited range of time periods that match the Geopolitical context of Genesis 14. In this account, Chedorlaomer is described as the king to whom the cities of the plain pay tribute. Thus, Elam must be a dominant force in the region and the other three kings would therefore be vassals of Elam and/or trading partners.

Trade
There were periods when Elam was allied with Mari through trade. Mari also had connections to Syria and Anatolia, who, in turn, had political, cultural, linguistic and military connections to Canaan. The earliest recorded empire was that of Sargon, which lasted until his grandson, Naram Sin.

According to Kenneth Kitchen, a better agreement with the conditions in the time of Chedorlaomer is provided by Ur Nammu. Mari had had links to the rest of Mesopotamia by Gulf trade as early as the Jemdet Nasr period but an expansion of political connections to Assyria did not occur until the time of Isbi-Erra. The Amorites or MARTU were also linked to the Hittites of Anatolia by trade.

Trade between the Harappan culture of India and the Jemdet Nasr flourished between c. 2000–1700 BCE. As Isin declined, the fortunes of Larsa – located between Eshnunna and Elam – rose until Larsa was defeated by Hammurabi. Between 1880 and 1820 BCE there was Assyrian trade with Anatolia, in particular in the metal "annakum", probably tin.

The main trade route between Ashur and Kanesh running between the Tigris and Euphrates passed through Harran. The empire of Shamshi-Adad I and Rim-Sin I included most of northern Mesopotamia. Thus, Kitchen concludes that this is the period in which the narrative of Genesis 14 falls into a close match with the events of the time of Shamsi Adad and Chedorlaomer

Rulers in the region in c. 1800 BCE
The relevant rulers in the region at this time were:

The last king of Isin, Damiq-ilishu, ruled 1816–1794
Rim Sin I of Larsa ruled 1822–1763
The last king of Uruk, Nabiilishu, ruled 1802
In Babylon, Hammurabi ruled 1792–1750
In Eshnunna Ibal Pi-El II ruled c 1762
In Elam there was a king Kuduzulush
In Ashur, Shamsi Adad I ruled c 1813-1781
In Mari, Yasmah-Adad ruled 1796–1780 followed by Zimri-Lin 1779–1757.

Dating of events
When cuneiform was first deciphered in the 19th century, Theophilus Pinches translated some Babylonian tablets which were part of the Spartoli collection in the British Museum and believed he had found in the "Chedorlaomer Tablets" the names of three of the "Kings of the East" named in Genesis 14. As this is the only part of Genesis which seems to set Abraham in wider political history, it seemed to many 19th and early 20th century exegetes and Assyriologists to offer an opening to date Abraham, if the kings in question could only be identified.

In 1887, Schrader was the first to propose that Amraphel could be an alternate spelling for Hammurabi. The terminal -bi on the end of Hammurabi's name was seen to parallel Amraphel since the cuneiform symbol for -bi can also be pronounced -pi. Tablets were known in which the initial symbol for Hammurabi, pronounced as kh to yield Khammurabi, had been dropped, so that Ammurapi was a viable pronunciation. If Hammurabi were deified in his lifetime or soon after (adding -il to his name to signify his divinity), this would produce something close to the Bible's Amraphel. A little later Jean-Vincent Scheil found a tablet in the Imperial Ottoman Museum in Istanbul from Hammurabi to a king named Kuder-Lagomer of Elam, which he identified with the same name in Pinches' tablet. Thus by the early 20th century many scholars had become convinced that the kings of Gen. 14:1 had been identified, resulting in the following correspondences:

Today these dating attempts are little more than a historical curiosity. On the one hand, as the scholarly consensus on Near Eastern ancient history moved towards placing Hammurabi in the late 18th century (or even later), and not the 19th, confessional and evangelical theologians found they had to choose between accepting these identifications or accepting the biblical chronology; most were disinclined to state that the Bible might be in error and so began synchronizing Abram with the empire of Sargon I, and the work of Schrader, Pinches and Scheil fell out of favour. Meanwhile, further research into Mesopotamia and Syria in the second millennium BCE undercut attempts to tie Abraham in with a definite century and to treat him as a strictly historical figure, and while linguistically not implausible, the identification of Hammurabi with Amraphel is now regarded as untenable.

One modern interpretation of Genesis 14 is summed up by Michael Astour in The Anchor Bible Dictionary (s.v. "Amraphel", "Arioch" and "Chedorlaomer"), who explains the story as a product of anti-Babylonian propaganda during the 6th century Babylonian captivity of the Jews:

After Böhl's widely accepted, but wrong, identification of mTu-ud-hul-a with one of the Hittite kings named Tudhaliyas, Tadmor found the correct solution by equating him with the Assyrian king Sennacherib (see Tidal). Astour (1966) identified the remaining two kings of the Chedorlaomer texts with Tukulti-Ninurta I of Assyria (see Arioch) and with the Chaldean Merodach-baladan (see Amraphel). The common denominator between these four rulers is that each of them, independently, occupied Babylon, oppressed it to a greater or lesser degree, and took away its sacred divine images, including the statue of its chief god Marduk; furthermore, all of them came to a tragic end ... All attempts to reconstruct the link between the Chedorlaomer texts and Genesis 14 remain speculative. However, the available evidence seems consistent with the following hypothesis: A Jew in Babylon, versed in Akkadian language and cuneiform script, found in an early version of the Chedorlaomer texts certain things consistent with his anti-Babylonian feelings.

The "Chedorlaomer tablets" are now thought to be from the 7th or 6th century BCE, a millennium after the time of Hammurabi, but at roughly the time when the main elements of Genesis are thought to have been set down. Another prominent scholar considers a relationship between the tablet and Genesis speculative, but identifies Tudhula as a veiled reference to Sennacherib of Assyria, and Chedorlaomer as "a recollection of a 12th century BCE king of Elam who briefly ruled Babylon."

The last serious attempt to place a historical Abraham in the second millennium resulted from discovery of the name Abi-ramu on Babylonian contracts of about 2000 BCE, but this line of argument lost its force when it was shown that the name was also common in the first millennium, leaving the patriarchal narratives in a relative biblical chronology but without an anchor in the known history of the Near East.

Some scholars have disagreed: Kitchen asserts that the only known historical period in which a king of Elam, whilst allied with Larsa, was able to enlist a Hittite king and a King of Eshunna as partners and allies in a war against Canaanite cities is in the time of Old Babylon c 1822–1764 BCE. This is when Babylon is under Hammurabi and Rim Sin I (Eri-Aku) controls Mari, which is linked through trade to the Hittites and other allies along the length of the Euphrates. This trade is mentioned in the Mari letters, a source which documents a geo-political relationship back to when the ships of Dilmun, Makkan and Meluhha docked at the quays of Agade in the time of Sargon. In the period of Old Babylon, c 1822–1764 BCE, Rim Sin I (Eri-Aku) brought together kings of Syro-Anatolia whose kingdoms were located on the Euphrates in a coalition focused on Mari whose king was Shamsi Adad. Kitchen uses the geo-political context, the price of slaves and the nature of the covenants entered into by Abraham to date the events he encounters. He sees the covenants, between Abraham and the other characters encountered at various points in Abraham's journeys, as datable textual artifacts having the form of legal documents which can be compared to the form of legal documents from different periods. Of particular interest is the relationship between Abraham and his wife, Sarah. When Sarah proves to be barren, she offers her handmaiden, Hagar, to Abraham to provide an heir. This arrangement, along with other aspects of the covenants of Abraham, lead Kitchen to a relatively narrow date range which he believes aligns with the time of Hammurabi.

See also
 Abram and Chedorlaomer

References
Notes

Siddim
Abraham
Lech-Lecha
Lot (biblical person)
Siddim
Torah places
Hebrew Bible valleys
Book of Genesis
Hammurabi